Genaro Rojas (born 15 September 1970) is a Mexican sprinter. He competed in the men's 4 × 100 metres relay at the 1992 Summer Olympics.

References

1970 births
Living people
Athletes (track and field) at the 1992 Summer Olympics
Mexican male sprinters
Olympic athletes of Mexico
Place of birth missing (living people)
20th-century Mexican people